A Question of Faith is a 2017 American Christian drama film. This film was released on September 29, 2017, by Pure Flix Entertainment.

Plot
When tragedy strikes three families, their destiny forces them on a converging path to discover God's love, grace and mercy as the challenges of their fate could also resurrect their beliefs.

Cast
 Richard T. Jones as David Newman
 Kim Fields as Theresa Newman
 C. Thomas Howell as John Danielson
 Renee O'Connor as Mary Danielson
 Gregory Alan Williams as Farnsworth Newman
 T.C. Stallings as Cecil King
 Jaci Velasquez as Kate Hernandez
 Amber Thompson as Michelle Danielson
 Karen Valero as Maria Hernandez
 Donna Biscoe as Patricia Newman
 Maiya Boyd as Eric's School Friend
 Stephanie Wilkinson as Dr. Timmons
 Kenneth Israel as Dr. Moore
 Marliss Amiea as Lisa Pearl
 James Hooper as Junior Newman
 Thom Scott II as Jordan Mayberry
 Caleb T. Thomas as Eric Newman

Release
A Question of Faith was released in the United States on September 29, 2017, and made $1 million from 661 theaters in its opening weekend (an average of $1,551 per venue).

Critical response
The Hollywood Reporter found the film "uplifting, if you’re a believer", acknowledging director Kevan Otto's passion for the film and Richard T. Jones's ability to make his character's arc "almost believable", but criticizing the heavy-handed storytelling and technical aspects of the film, which it found "more on the level of broadcast TV than cinema". The LA Times called it "a religious pamphlet with actors", saying that the script "plays like a first draft, one written from a manual and riddled with two-dimensional characters and on-the-nose dialogue." On review aggregator website Rotten Tomatoes, the film has an approval rating of 40% based on 5 reviews, and an average rating of 5.8/10.

Soundtrack
The film features music by Nelson Jackson with additional score by Jason Solowsky. A soundtrack album was released that contains songs by The Nelons, Cecil Thompson, Amber Nelon Thompson, Deloris White, Y'Anna Crawley, and John Paul McGee.

References

External links 
 
 
 
 

2017 films
2017 drama films
African-American drama films
Films about Christianity
Films about evangelicalism
Pure Flix Entertainment films
2010s English-language films
2010s American films